Vraneštica is a former municipality in western North Macedonia, created in the 1996 territorial organisation and dissolved following the 2013 Macedonian new territorial organisation, after it was merged with Kičevo Municipality. Vraneštica is also the name of the village where the municipal seat was found. This municipality was part of the Southwestern Statistical Region. The last mayor of the municipality was Vančo Srbakovski.

Demographics
According to the last national census from 2002, this municipality has 1,322 inhabitants. Ethnic groups in the municipality include:
Macedonians = 1033 (78.1%)
Turks* = 276 (20.9%)
Albanians = 10
Serbs = 2
Other = 1

In the municipality Muslim Macedonians have identified themselves as Turks, for various political reasons.

References

External links

 Official website

Former municipalities of North Macedonia
Kičevo Municipality